Steller Secondary School is an alternative school located in Anchorage, Alaska. The Anchorage School District established the school in 1974 as a response to a proposal by the Committee of Alternative Secondary Education.  Steller was named after Georg Wilhelm Steller, a naturalist from Germany who traveled with Vitus Bering on an exploratory voyage to Alaska.

History
For the first nine years of its existence, Steller was located in the old North Star Elementary School building. After much political activity by Steller parents, the Alaska Legislature approved funds to remodel the school and add a new gym as well as a drama facility/auditorium.  In 1992, the auditorium was rebuilt after a structural failure caused the roof to collapse, leaving nearly everything ruined except for the stage's curtains.  The voters of Anchorage approved a school bond in 2003 to provide funding for the addition of a new science lab and relocation and renovation of the staff lounge, offices surrounding the gymnasium, and the special education office.  This construction was completed in October 2004.

Notable alumni
 Marty Beckerman, author, humorist, journalist, and features editor with Esquire magazine
 Mark Begich, former Mayor of Anchorage, Alaska and former U.S. Senator from Alaska
 Mario Chalmers, basketball player (7-9th grades)
 Gretchen Guess, member of Alaska House of Representatives 2000–2002 and Alaska Senate 2002–2006, Anchorage School District School Board Chair, 2011–2013 
 Lindsey Holmes, member of Alaska House of Representatives 2006–present (9th through 11th grades)
 Jewel, singer (9th & 10th grades)
 Trajan Langdon, basketball player

References

External links
 Steller Secondary School website (Old)

1974 establishments in Alaska
Alternative schools in the United States
Anchorage School District
Educational institutions established in 1974
High schools in Anchorage, Alaska
Magnet schools in Alaska
Public high schools in Alaska
Public middle schools in Alaska